NA-1 may refer to:

NA-1 (Chitral), a constituency in the National Assembly of Pakistan
Namco NA-1, a 16-bit arcade system board